Juan José Longhini (born 5 August 1984 in Olavarría, Argentina) is an Argentine footballer currently playing for Huracán Goya.

Teams 
  Ferro Carril Sud 2006
  Grupo Universitario 2006-2007
  Ferro Carril Sud 2007-2008
  Deportes La Serena 2009
  Ferro Carril Sud 2010-2014
  Huracán Goya 2014-

See also 
Football in Argentina
List of football clubs in Argentina

References

External links 
 

1984 births
Living people
Argentine footballers
Argentine expatriate footballers
Deportes La Serena footballers
Expatriate footballers in Chile
Expatriate footballers in Bolivia
Association football forwards
Sportspeople from Buenos Aires Province